Violet Honnor Morten (13 November 1861 – 11 July 1913) was a British nurse, journalist and politician.

Born in Cheam in Surrey, Morten began training as a nurse in 1882, with Eva Luckes at the London Hospital.  She qualified as a midwife, and also completed a course on scientific hygiene at Bedford College.  In 1889, she founded the Women Writers' Club, and around this time she also founded the Association of Asylum Workers.  In 1890, she and Mary Belcher founded the Nurses' Co-operation, which attempted to act as both a trade union and a co-operative guild.

Mortene began writing articles on nursing for numerous publications, and in 1891 her influential Nurse's Dictionary of Medical Terms and Nursing Treatment was published.  She joined the Fabian Society in 1892, serving on its executive committee from 1895 until 1898.  From 1896, she lived at the Hoxton Settlement, and the following year was elected to represent the district on the London School Board.  However, following complaints about her smoking in public, she switched to represent the City of London.  On the board, she campaigned for equal pay for women and school nurses, and against corporal punishment.  She founded the School Nurses' Society to further her campaigns.

In 1905, Morten moved to Rotherfield in Sussex, where she founded Oakdene, a Tolstoyan settlement, which also served as a respite home for disabled children from London.  She became increasingly religious, writing  The Enclosed Nun anonymously, and then St Clare under her own name.

Morten supported the women's suffrage campaign, in particular the tax resistance movement, as a result of which some of her property was seized and auctioned.

References

1861 births
1913 deaths
Nurses from London
English suffragists
Members of the Fabian Society
Members of the London School Board
People from Cheam
People from Rotherfield